John Foster McCreight,  (1827 – November 18, 1913) was a jurist and the first premier of British Columbia.

Early life
McCreight was born in Caledon, County Tyrone, Ireland, to a well-established and well-connected family. After completing law studies at Trinity College Dublin, he was called to the bar in 1852. Shortly thereafter, McCreight left Ireland to establish a practice in Melbourne, Australia. McCreight left Australia in 1859 and sailed first to San Francisco and then to Victoria, British Columbia.

Life and career in British Columbia
At the time of McCreight's arrival in Victoria in 1860, it was the capital of the Colony of Vancouver Island, which at the time was governed by the powerful and autocratic Chief Factor of the Hudson's Bay Company, Sir James Douglas. In 1862, McCreight was called to the British Columbia bar and opened a practice in Victoria. By all accounts, he led a quiet and solitary life in the city, his main occupations outside of his work being his involvement in the local Masonic Lodge and as an active layperson in the congregation of the local Anglican cathedral.

By 1866, the colonies of Vancouver Island and British Columbia had merged. Although the united colony did not join the Canadian confederation when it was effected in 1867, the worrisome economic and strategic situation soon made such an arrangement attractive. British Columbia joined confederation on July 20, 1871, and McCreight joined the interim transitional cabinet as Attorney General. During the first provincial general election that October, McCreight won a seat for Victoria City in the legislature, and Sir Joseph Trutch, the Lieutenant Governor, chose him to be British Columbia's first premier. He continued to hold the attorney-generalship as well.

By all accounts, McCreight was temperamentally ill-suited to public life. His colleague, Henry Pering Pellew Crease, described the Premier as "bad tempered and queer...by fits & turns extremely credulous & extremely suspicious...excessively obstinate in the wrong places...close and reserved in his daily life...[and] utterly ignorant of politics". Nonetheless, McCreight's administration was a productive one, passing three dozen pieces of legislation in less than a year. His inability to form alliances and mollify the sometimes narrow and sectional interests of MLAs led to a loss of support, however, and in 1872, he resigned after losing a motion of no confidence following the Speech from the Throne.

He served as the first Treasurer (chief elected officer) of the incorporated Law Society of British Columbia from 1874 to 1880.

Supreme Court Justice and retirement
McCreight remained in the legislature until 1875, after which he returned to his law practice as a Queen's Counsel. Five years later, he was made a justice of the Supreme Court of British Columbia. In that capacity, he served in the Cariboo, Victoria, and finally in 1883 New Westminster before retiring in 1897, at the age of 70. He experienced a crisis of faith, sometime in the 1880s and converted to Roman Catholicism in 1883. McCreight returned to the United Kingdom, dying at Hastings, East Sussex at the age of 86.

Legacy
McCreight Lake, north west of Campbell River, British Columbia is named for him.

References

External links
Biography at the Dictionary of Canadian Biography Online

1827 births
1913 deaths
19th-century Australian lawyers
19th-century Irish lawyers
Premiers of British Columbia
Canadian Roman Catholics
Converts to Roman Catholicism from Anglicanism
Irish emigrants to pre-Confederation British Columbia
Pre-Confederation British Columbia people
People from Hastings
Politicians from County Tyrone
Attorneys General of British Columbia
Canadian King's Counsel
Lawyers in British Columbia
Canadian people of Ulster-Scottish descent